Irlanda Mora (9 February 1939 – 18 November 2010) was a Colombian actress who was born in Ibagué. She was best known for acting in Un sueño de amor (A Dream of Love), Los caciques (The Caciques) and La montaña del diablo (The Devil's Mountain).

Career 
Irlanda debuted in the 1952 film Aquellos ojos verdes (Those green eyes) as a younger version of the main character, Silvia Falcón. She continued to act in films until the 1990s, but also started acting in Mexican soap operas such as María la del Barrio and as Aunt Paz in María Mercedes. After retiring from television and film in 2005, she died in November 2010.

Filmography

Movies

Television

References

External links
 

1939 births
2010 deaths
Colombian actresses
People from Ibagué